This article is a list of shopping malls, locally referred to as "shopping centers" in Chile.

City of Concepción 
Mall del Centro Concepción
Mall Plaza
Mall Plaza El Trébol
Mall Plaza Mirador Bio Bio

City of Las Condes 
Mall Plaza Los Dominicos

City of La Reina 
Mall Plaza Egaña

Santiago Metropolitan Region 
Alto Las Condes
Costanera Center	
Mall Arauco
Mall Arauco Maipú
Mall Arauco Quilicura
Parque Arauco
Mall Barrio Independencia
Mall Florida Center
Mall Paseo Quilín
Mall Plaza
Mall Plaza Alameda
Mall Plaza Egaña
Mall Plaza Los Dominicos
Mall Plaza Norte
Mall Plaza Oeste
Mall Plaza Sur
Mall Plaza Tobalaba
Mall Plaza Vespucio
Portal La Dehesa

Valpariso Region 
Arauco Outlet Curacuma
Arauco San Antonio
Espacio Urbano Los Andes
Mall Marina 
Mall Paseo Ross
Mall Shopping Center Quillota
Open La Calera
Open San Felipe
Portal Belloto
Viña Outlet Park

Chile
Shopping malls